Julie Daniels (born February 12, 1954) is an American politician who has served in the Oklahoma Senate from the 29th district since 2016.

References

1954 births
Living people
Republican Party Oklahoma state senators
21st-century American politicians
21st-century American women politicians
University of Oklahoma alumni
University of Tulsa College of Law alumni
Women state legislators in Oklahoma